The 2013–14 Chicago State Cougars men's basketball team represented Chicago State University during the 2013–14 NCAA Division I men's basketball season. The Cougars, led by fourth year head coach Tracy Dildy, played their home games at the Emil and Patricia Jones Convocation Center as new members of the Western Athletic Conference. They finished the season 13–19, 8–8 in WAC play to finish in fourth place. They lost in the quarterfinals of the WAC tournament to Cal State Bakersfield.

Roster

Schedule and results

|-
!colspan=9 style="background:#28372F; color:#FFFFFF;"| Regular season

|-
!colspan=9 style="background:#28372F; color:#FFFFFF;"| WAC tournament

See also
 2013–14 Chicago State Cougars women's basketball team

References

Chicago State Cougars men's basketball seasons
Chicago State